The 1988 World Mountain Running Championships was the 4th edition of the global mountain running competition, World Mountain Running Championships, organised by the World Mountain Running Association and was held in Keswick, Cumbria, United Kingdom on 15 October 1988.

Results

Men
Distance 14.0 km, difference in height 1185 m (climb).

Men team

Men short distance

Men short distance team

Men junior

Men junior team

Women

Women team

References

External links
 World Mountain Running Association official web site

World Mountain Running Championships
World Long Distance Mountain Running